The Corris Railway is a narrow gauge preserved railway based in Corris on the border between Merionethshire (now Gwynedd) and Montgomeryshire (now Powys) in Mid-Wales.

The line opened in 1859 as a horse tramway, running originally from quays on the River Dyfi at Morben and Derwenlas, skirting the town of Machynlleth and then following the Dulas Valley north to Corris and on to Aberllefenni. Branches served the slate quarries at Corris Uchaf, Aberllefenni, the isolated quarries around Ratgoed and quarries along the length of the Dulas Valley.

The railway closed in 1948, but a preservation society was formed in 1966, initially opening a museum; a short section of line between Corris and Maespoeth was re-opened to passengers in 2002. The railway now operates as a tourist attraction. A new steam locomotive was built for the railway, which was delivered in 2005. The two surviving locomotives, plus some of the original rolling stock, are preserved on the nearby Talyllyn Railway.

History

Commercial history

Precursor schemes: 1850 to 1858 

Before 1859, slate from the quarries at Corris, Corris Uchaf and Aberllefenni was hauled by horse-drawn carts and sledges to wharves on the banks of the River Dyfi. The first proposal to construct a railway connecting the quarries to the coast came in August 1850, when the owners of the Aberllefenni, Abercorris, Gaewern and Hengae quarries met with engineer Arthur Causton to propose the Abercorris and Aberdovery Railway. By November 1850, the name had changed to the Corris, Machynlleth & River Dovey Railway or Tramroad which was planned to run down the Dulas Valley and then along the north shore of the Dyfi past Pennal to Pant Eidal, near the later main-line Gogarth Halt. A bill was submitted in early 1851, withdrawn, then resubmitted in December.

This 1851 scheme was not constructed, and was followed by two further proposals in the early 1850s. Following the plans for a  railway along the Dyfi valley, these early proposals were shelved.

In December 1857, a fourth bill was set before Parliament to create the Corris Machynlleth & River Dovey Tramroad (CM&RDT). This was similar to the 1851 scheme, except that it proposed to cross the Dyfi near Machynlleth and then follow the south bank of the river, and proposed a tramway from the "machine house" (i.e. the slate mill) at Aberllefenni, down to the wharf at "Cae Goch on the River Dovey" (Cae Goch was near to the later main line Glandyfi station). This bill was passed on 12 July 1858.

The Tramroad Era: 1858 to 1878 
After more than eight years of proposals, the 1859 scheme was the one that was built. Construction proceeded quickly, and by April 1859 the tramroad opened between Machynlleth and Corris. The section from Aberllefenni to Corris was built later that year. The section from Machynlleth to Morben was opened later. It is thought that the tramroad never extended beyond Morben.

On 3 January 1863, the standard gauge Newtown and Machynlleth Railway had opened, followed on 1 July of the same year by the Aberystwith and Welsh Coast Railway's (A&WCR) line from Machynlleth to Borth. These two lines became part of the Cambrian Railways by August 1865. The opening of the standard gauge line to Borth made the section of the CM&RDT from Machynlleth to Morben obsolete. It was much easier to transship slates to the main line at Machynlleth, so the lower section of the tramway was abandoned.

In 1862, a new Bill was deposited, seeking to extend the Upper Corris Tramway to iron ore mines at Tir Stent, near the pub at Cross Foxes. The bill also sought powers to raise further capital for the tramroad and allow the use of locomotives. But the directors of the A&WCR objected and the Bill failed. Another similar Bill was deposited in December 1863, and again the A&WCR opposed it. This time, however, they withdrew their objection; the CM&RDT company had been acquired by Thomas Savin, who was the principal contractor in the construction of the tramroad, and Savin had offered to sell the company to the A&WCR. The second Bill passed on 25 July 1864; it formally converted the tramroad to a railway changing the company's name to the Corris Railway Company, allowed the use of steam locomotives and allowed the abandonment of the section west of Machynlleth.

It took until the 1870s for work to begin to upgrade the Corris Railway to a standard where locomotives could be used. The original tramroad was laid with light bridge rail suitable for waggons  to traverse as they were pulled by horses. These rails would not support the weight of much heavier steam locomotives. In 1878, control of the railway passed to the Imperial Tramways Company of London. The new owners saw the potential for passenger traffic on the Corris Railway and ordered the first passenger carriages for the railway, even though the Act of 1864 did not permit passengers to be carried. They also appointed Joseph R. Dix, son of the main-line stationmaster at Machynlleth, as Manager in successor to David Owen.

The Dix Years: 1879 to 1906 

In 1880 and 1883, two new Acts were obtained which adjusted the tolls on the railway and permitted the carriage of passengers. The second of these Acts was necessary because the owners of the quarries served by the railway objected that passenger trains would interfere with their mineral traffic. Initially the railway ran a test passenger service on the local roads; this proved to be so popular that they were able to pass the parliamentary act over the opposition of the quarry owners. It was also the first instance of a long history of the Corris Railway operating passenger road services in the area.

In December 1878 the first steam locomotive purchased from the Hughes Locomotive Company arrived. By February 1879 it had been joined by the other two that had been ordered and all three had begun work. Although the carriages arrived in 1878 it was not until 1883 that the Act of Parliament was secured to allow the formal commencement of passenger services. A semi-official passenger service had been running since the early 1870s using adapted waggons  to convey quarry workers and visitors.

The line was now in its settled form and began to operate a full service under Dix's energetic management. The railway was widely promoted to visitors as the best route to Tal-y-llyn Lake and Cader Idris (ignoring the claims of the rival Talyllyn Railway).

The railway developed a network of horse-hauled road services, including providing a link between Corris station and Abergynolwyn station on the Talyllyn Railway. This was promoted as part of a circular "Grand Tour" which took in the two narrow gauge railways and the Cambrian service between Tywyn and Machynlleth.

In 1892, control of Imperial Tramways moved to Bristol and George White of Bristol Tramways became chairman and Clifton Robinson became managing director. In the 1900s, Bristol motor buses were sent by the parent company to run the road services.

Decline: 1906 to 1930 
Following a dispute with the directors, Dix was dismissed and replaced by John J O'Sullivan (formerly of the Cork, Blackrock and Passage Railway). The closure of Braichgoch Quarry in 1906 brought the railway its first loss, and although the line continued on through subsequent decades, serving the quarries around Corris and Aberllefenni, it never again showed a profit. As well as slate and passengers, the line hauled timber extracted from the Dyfi forest in the 1910s through 1930s. There was also a constant traffic in coal and general goods to the quarries and communities served by the railway.

After World War I, the decline in slate traffic continued as cheaper foreign slate and alternative roofing materials became popular. O'Sullivan had died in office in 1917; the parent company's Secretary, Frederick H Withers, acted as manager until a new manager, Daniel J McCourt (who had worked on Imperial's Middlesbrough system until that was taken over by the local municipality) took over in 1921 and was responsible for developing and extending the connecting bus services as partial compensation for the decline in rail traffic.

Takeover and nationalisation: 1931 to 1948 
In late 1929, Imperial Tramways sold the Corris to the Great Western Railway (GWR), who by that time were the owners of the main line serving Machynlleth, whose primary interest was taking control of the railway's bus routes. After running a bus in direct competition with the railway in 1930, the railway's passenger service was withdrawn at the beginning of 1931. While the GWR did not relish owning another Welsh narrow gauge line, they did perform some track maintenance, and on at least two occasions the rolling stock was repainted.

On 1 January 1948, the line was nationalised along with its parent company, becoming part of British Railways (BR). While the GWR had tolerated the Corris, BR was looking for an excuse to close the loss making railway. In August 1948, that excuse came when the River Dyfi flooded. The waters began to undermine the Corris Railway embankment on the south side of the Dovey Bridge, and although the track was never breached, it was the excuse that BR needed to close the line. The last train ran on 20 August 1948 and the following day the railway was closed, without notice. The Aberllefenni to Corris section was lifted in November 1948, and 10 tons of the rail was purchased by Henry Haydn Jones for use on his Talyllyn Railway. By the end of 1950, track lifting had reached Machynlleth station.

In 1951, the Talyllyn Railway became the first railway in the world to be preserved. The Talyllyn purchased the two remaining locomotives, which had been stored out of use at Machynlleth, along with several goods waggons  and the brake van – see List of Talyllyn Railway rolling stock. In 1958, the Talyllyn also purchased one of the Corris carriages, which had been in use as a summerhouse in a garden in Gobowen.

Preservation

Early days: 1966 to 1980 

In December 1966 a group of enthusiasts led by Alan Meaden, formed the Corris Society (which later became the Corris Railway Society) with the aim of preserving what was left of the railway, opening a dedicated museum, and to explore the possibility of reviving some or all of the line. Many of the founding members of the Society were volunteers on the nearby Talyllyn Railway.

Other than at Aberllefenni and Braichgoch quarries, no rails remained in situ along the Corris route. Initially the Society sought to purchase Machynlleth station for its museum, but when this proved impossible it turned its sights elsewhere. The main buildings of Corris station were demolished in 1968 leaving only the adjacent railway stable block standing, and these buildings – badly in need of maintenance – were acquired, along with a short section of trackbed leading southwards. In 1970 the first part of the building was opened as the Corris Railway Museum. A short length of "demonstration" track was laid in 1971.

During the 1970s, the Society undertook lengthy negotiations with the relevant authorities to establish the requirements for re-opening the line for passengers, while steadily building up funds and equipment. A new Corris Railway Company, reviving the original name, was incorporated to act as the Society's trading and operating arm, while the Society achieved charitable status. The Museum was extended as more of the building was returned to satisfactory condition.

Restoring from Maespoeth: 1981 to 2001 

In 1981 the line's original locomotive shed at Maespoeth was acquired and became the railway's operational base. During the 1980s light track was laid between Maespoeth and Corris, a distance of just under a mile (1.6 km). The formal "first train" back to Corris ran in 1985. In the following years the track was upgraded to passenger standards while negotiations with the authorities continued.

Passenger services resume: 2002 to present 
In the summer of 2002, passenger services resumed after a break of seventy-two years, initially diesel-hauled. The railway built a new steam locomotive, to a design based on the Kerr Stuart No. 4, which arrived on the railway on 17 May 2005 and runs as No. 7 (the Corris Railway never officially named its locomotives). No. 7 went into service on 20 August 2005, fifty-seven years to the day since the last train on the original railway, and now hauls the regular passenger service between Corris and Maespoeth.

The railway is also actively pursuing a southwards extension towards Machynlleth, with the initial aim of extending the line to Tan-y-Coed, midway between Esgairgeiliog and Llwyngwern and some 2 miles south of Corris. As always, this is involving lengthy negotiations with the authorities, not least due to the line south of Maespoeth running immediately adjacent to the A487 trunk road. While these are continuing the railway has consolidated its facilities at Maespoeth with the construction of a new two-road carriage shed in the adjacent field (the original carriage sheds at Corris and Machynlleth having been demolished). In 2015 work began on building the new diversion embankment to enable the southerly extension.

During 2009, the railway marked the 150th anniversary of the first train on the Corris with a series of events, including demonstration horse-worked freight trains and gravity runs of rakes of waggons.

The revived Corris Railway has maintained friendly links with the Talyllyn Railway, which resulted in both of the original Corris locos and rolling stock returning to the railway. In 1996 ex-Corris loco No. 4 returned to celebrate its 75th anniversary. In 2003, ex-Corris loco No. 3 returned on the occasion of its 125th anniversary with a heritage train of carriage No. 17, brake van No. 6 and two trucks. Corris No. 5 visited the Talyllyn Railway in 1983 and 1990, and No. 7 in October 2011. It hauled a few charter trains and played a part in the TR's Corris Weekend, when it ran with the two surviving ex Corris engines; No. 4 (Edward Thomas) and No. 3 (Sir Haydn) and stock.

Both the surviving original locomotives have visited the Corris since its reopening. In 2012, No. 3 featured in a steam Gala over May Bank Holiday weekend along with the railway's resident steam loco No. 7. No. 3's boiler ticket expired on 17 May 2012 and the loco was on static display at Maespoeth until February 2013, when the loco left the Corris to tour heritage railways and museums in the UK to raise awareness of the Talyllyn and to raise funds for its overhaul.

About the railway 

The Corris Railway had several unusual features:

The  gauge is rare, shared by only three other public lines in the UK: the nearby Talyllyn Railway and Plynlimon and Hafan Tramway and the Campbeltown and Machrihanish Light Railway in Scotland.
Its origins as a horse tramroad and ascent through the narrow and winding Dulas valley meant it had exceptionally tight curves. Its original passenger carriages were simple 4-wheelers derived from urban horse-drawn tramway designs with end balconies; they rode poorly and were quickly rebuilt into longer bogie carriages by placing two of the original bodies end-to-end on a longer underframe.
The stations were exceptionally narrow, again because of the geography of the line, and all were on the east side of the rails, so the carriages and locomotives had doors on that side only, as on the Talyllyn Railway.
The vertical trestle waggons for carrying large slabs of slate from the quarries were also rarely found on other railways, notable exceptions being the Ffestiniog Railway and the nearby Hendre-Ddu Tramway.
Corris Station and the original Machynlleth Station had overall roofs, features which were rare on a British narrow gauge railway. At Corris, the roof was over the main running line and trains for Aberllefenni passed under it; at Machynlleth the rear of the train rested under the station roof while the front was in the open air. The original Machynlleth station was demolished and replaced in 1905 with the building that still stands alongside the A487 trunk road north of the main-line railway overbridge. The track bed continued under the main-line railway overbridge alongside Heol Y Doll, through its own short tunnel that is closed with stone blocks. Beyond the overbridge, a Texaco petrol station is sited on the former route.

Route

Stations and halts 
 Cei (or Quay) Ward, a wharf on the River Dyfi at Morben, the main transshipment point for the original tramroad. Closed in the 1860s. The line may never have extended beyond Morben.
 Cei Tafarn Isa and Cei Ellis, wharves on the River Dyfi at Derwenlas where slates were off-loaded onto shipping. Closed in the 1860s when the bend of the river was cut off by the construction of the Aberystwith and Welsh Coast Railway.
 , the southern passenger terminus serving the town of Machynlleth. This was the main slate transshipment point following the building of Cambrian Railways (later GWR and BR). The passenger station was an interchange station with the Cambrian Railways station, and was rebuilt in 1904. The station once housed a carriage shed and signal box. The trackbed here is now covered by an industrial estate, but the station building still survives. On the original tramroad, there were some stables to the north of the station.
  for Llanwrin village and the small hamlet of Fridd. The station was situated beside the railway's Level crossing over the B4404 road.
 , an unofficial stopping point, in the Ffridd Woods.
 , another unofficial stopping point, slightly closer to Pantperthog village than Llwyngwern station.
  serving Pantperthog village and the Plas Llyn-gwern house, on the opposite side of the valley.
 , serving the Tan-y-Coed Natural Resources Wales picnic site. This station never existed on the original railway (neither did the picnic site), but is proposed as a major station and temporary terminus of the revived railway.
  serving Ceinws and Esgairgeiliog villages, on the opposite side of the Dulas River.
 Maespoeth Junction locomotive and carriage shed, no passenger station. The site housed a signal box until the Second World War, which controlled the points for the junction with the Upper Corris Tramway and points in the yard. Maespoeth is the current southern terminus of the preserved railway.
 Corris, the railway's primary northern station serving Corris village. As well as the station building, the site housed a stables, a parcel office, and a carriage shed. A signal box existed here until the Second World War, which controlled points in the yard. Corris station is the northern terminus of the preserved railway.
 , serving the hamlet of Garneddwen – a row of Aberllefenni quarry workers' housing. The trackbed here is now an access road for the hamlet.
 , the northern passenger terminus serving the village of Aberllefenni. A narrow station, perched on a steep slope. The site is now covered by a housing estate.

Branch lines and tramways 
The Corris Railway had numerous branch lines, mainly built to serve the slate quarries along its route. The principal branches were:

 The Upper Corris Tramway from  serving Braichgoch slate mine and quarries surrounding Corris Uchaf.
 The Matthew's Mill Siding near  serving Y Magnus slate enamelling works.
 The Aberllefenni quarry tramway connecting the slate mill with three quarries.
 The Ratgoed Tramway north of  serving Cymerau Quarry and Ratgoed Quarry.

Only the Aberllefenni Quarry tramway may have been locomotive worked, and in the 1960s and 1970s a tractor was used to haul waggons along it. The rest of these branches were operated by gravity and horses.

Other temporary branches were built to aid forestry works from the First World War until the 1930s.

Quarries served 
The principal reason for the existence of the Corris Railway was to serve the slate quarries of this district. Although usually referred to as quarries, those on the Narrow Vein were usually underground mine workings, following the course of the vein, while those on the Broad Vein were more usually opencast quarries. The outliers in the south of the valley were also opencast. This list shows the main quarries that the railway served:

 Abercorris quarry – connected to Maespoeth Junction by the Upper Corris Tramway
 Gaewern quarry – connected to the Upper Corris Tramway, subsequently worked together with Braichgoch.
 Braichgoch quarry – connected to the Upper Corris Tramway
 Abercwmeiddaw quarry – the main Broad Vein quarry in the Corris area. Connected to the Upper Corris Tramway.
 Aberllefenni quarries – connected via internal tramway at Aberllefenni
 Cambergi quarry – not directly connected, but output carried by cart to Aberllefenni
 Cymerau quarry – connected to the Ratgoed Tramway
 Ratgoed quarry – connected to the Ratgoed Tramway

The railway also served Y Magnus (Matthew's Mill), a slate enamelling works situated between Aberllefenni and Garneddwen with its own tramway.

Locomotives

Original railway 
Three locomotives were supplied in 1878, and partially rebuilt between 1883 and 1900 from s to s. By the 1920s the locomotives were badly worn. A new locomotive, No. 4, was supplied in 1921. In 1923, parts from Nos. 1 and 3 were combined to produce one working locomotive, which carried the number 3. The remaining original locomotive, No 2, was held in reserve until 1928. A report dated 12 October 1929 stated that locomotives 1 and 2 had been "marked off for some time as scrap" and the remains of both engines were handed over to a local scrap merchant and excluded from the assets taken over by the GWR.

The locomotives that ran on the original Corris Railway between 1878 and 1948 (none carried names on the Corris) were:

Preserved railway 
Locomotives brought to the restored Corris Railway since 1967 have been numbered in the original locomotive numbering series, from 5 onwards. They are:

Usage 
, locomotive 7 is the only steam engine, but will share passenger duties with locomotive 10 on completion. Locomotive 11 is the main diesel motive power unit for both works trains and out of season passenger trains, supported by the lighter diesel locomotives 5 and 6, which are currently the main works and shunting units.

Carriages

Historic 
The CM&RDT carried passengers from as early as 1860, despite this being explicitly prohibited by its authorising Act. Until 1874, passengers travelled in open waggons attached to the quarry trains. From October 1874, the railway ran separate, timetabled passenger trains. Around 1875, at least two wagons were converted to crude, almost windowless closed carriages.

In November 1878, ten four-wheel, tramcar-like carriages were delivered from the Falcon Works, Loughborough. They were numbered 1 to 10, with a brake van from the same source taking the number 11. The first bogie carriage, also from Falcon, which looked like two four-wheel bodies mounted on a single chassis, received number 12, and the four-wheelers were rebuilt over a five-year period on new chassis to form five bogie vehicles. A renumbering had the rebuilds as 1 to 5 and the former 12 becoming 6.

Two all-new carriages to a similar design were built by the Metropolitan Railway Carriage and Wagon Company Ltd and numbered 7 & 8. Nos. 1 to 6 disappeared, presumed scrapped, after 1930; however Nos. 7 and 8 were used by a GWR employee at his home in Gobowen and subsequently preserved. No. 8 (used as a greenhouse-cum-garden shed) was recovered in 1958 and rebuilt for use on the Talyllyn Railway as their No.17 while No.7 (used as a chicken coop) was recovered ten years later and is on display in the Corris Railway Museum. The brake van was also preserved on the Talyllyn but has been substantially rebuilt after being damaged in a fire.

Current 

As nineteen passenger vehicles (ten four-wheel carriages, eight bogie carriages and the brake van) ran on the original railway, the preservation Society has numbered its new build carriages from 20 onwards.

Carriage 7 is an original bogie carriage, but not available for service. It is on display in the railway museum at Corris.

Carriage 20 is similar in appearance to the bogie vehicles, but on a shorter, ex-National Coal Board four-wheel chassis. The southern compartment is fitted for the use of the train guard. It currently carries a plain un-lined livery but is due to be fully lined and lettered in due course.

Carriage 21 has been designed to appear as similar as possible to the original 19th Century bogie vehicles, but constructed to 21st Century safety standards with a steel chassis based on the Talyllyn Railway's standard bogie carriage design and a steel skeleton with timber cladding for the body. Completed in May 2003, it has a plain roof.

Carriage 22 has been constructed to the same standards as outlined above. Completed in July 2015, it has a clerestory roof, similar to those carried by two original carriages in the 1920s. From the completion of fitting-out in September 2015 the railway was again able to run an authentic-looking "1920s" train with the "Tattoo" locomotive and two bogie carriages.

Carriage 23 is another plain roof example. Assembly of the woodwork for the body commenced in autumn 2015, with the panelling and beading completed by the end of 2017; painting and fitting of seats continued during the Coronavirus lockdown, and the completed carriage was mounted on its bogies and test run in July 2020; it entered passenger service in 2021; the final stage was the addition of gold lining and lettering (to match coaches 21 and 22), which was completed by Easter 2022.

Carriage 24 is currently under construction at Maespoeth. It will be a first class carriage, with a clerestory roof. The main frame was constructed, and the metal body frame added, before the Coronavirus pandemic, during which construction slowed. Construction resumed apace in 2021, and body panels (with beading) have been fitted.

See also 
List of 2 ft 3 in gauge railways
List of British heritage and private railways
British narrow gauge railways

References

Bibliography

External links 

 Corris Railway Society

 
Heritage railways in Gwynedd
Great Western Railway constituents
Slate industry in Wales
Railway companies established in 1858
Railway lines opened in 1859
Railway lines closed in 1948
2 ft 3 in gauge railways in Wales
Horse-drawn railways
Corris
1858 establishments in Wales
British companies established in 1858
Early Welsh railway companies